

Arthropoda

New taxa

Archosauromorphs

Dinosaurs
Data courtesy of George Olshevsky's dinosaur genera list.

Birds

Pterosaurs

Synapids

Popular culture

Literature
 Bronto the Dinosaur was published. Its storyline was similar to another 1960s work aimed at children,Pataud, le petit dinosaure. The book was marketed as "educationally sound, paleontologist William A. S. Sarjeant said the book "cannot justly make that claim" on the basis of several scientific improbabilities.

References

 
Paleontology
Paleontology 7